Joseph or Joe Gormley may refer to:

Joe Gormley (baseball) (1866–1950), pitcher for the Philadelphia Phillies (1891)
Joe Gormley (footballer) (born 1989), football player (Cliftonville FC, Peterborough United, St Johnstone)
Joe Gormley (trade unionist) (1917–1993), President of the National Union of Mineworkers (1971–82)
Joseph L. Gormley (1914–2004), American forensic scientist

See also
Gormley (surname)